Oodinus is a genus of beetles in the family Carabidae, containing the following species:

 Oodinus alutaceus (Bates, 1882) 
 Oodinus amazonus (Chaudoir, 1882) 
 Oodinus arechavaletae (Chaudoir, 1882) 
 Oodinus darlingtoni Bousquet, 1996 
 Oodinus edentulus Bousquet, 1996 
 Oodinus exiguus (Andrewes, 1933)  
 Oodinus limbellus (Chaudoir, 1882) 
 Oodinus piceus Motschulsky, 1864 
 Oodinus pseudopiceus Bousquet, 1996 
 Oodinus similis Bousquet, 1996

References

Licininae